David Bryan Leon (born September 28, 1987) is an American soccer player who played one season for Pittsburgh Riverhounds in the USL Professional Division.

Career

Youth & College
After playing club soccer with Albertson SC for six years, as well Herricks High School, Leon spent his college career at George Washington University. In his four seasons with the Colonials, Leon made 56 appearances and recorded four goals and eight assists.

Professional
After working as a consultant for Deloitte Consulting Firm for three years, Leon signed his first professional contract with USL Pro club Pittsburgh Riverhounds for the 2012 season.  He made his professional debut on April 6, 2012, in a 1-0 road victory over Antigua Barracuda FC.

References

External links
 George Washington University bio

1987 births
Living people
American soccer players
George Washington Colonials men's soccer players
Pittsburgh Riverhounds SC players
USL Championship players
People from Manhasset, New York
Association football midfielders
Soccer players from New York (state)
Sportspeople from Nassau County, New York